Acanthophila alacella is a moth of the family Gelechiidae. It is known from most of Europe, the northern Caucasus, Georgia and Iran.

Adults are on wing from July to August.

The larvae feed on lichens on tree-trunks.

References

Moths described in 1839
alacella
Moths of Europe
Moths of Asia